Live at Memory Lane is a live album by jazz cornetist Nat Adderley released on the Atlantic label featuring performances by Adderley's Quintet with Joe Henderson, Joe Zawinul, Victor Gaskin, and Roy McCurdy.

Reception
The Allmusic review awarded the album 2½ stars.

Track listing
All compositions by Nat Adderley except as indicated
 "On My Journey Now" - 4:49  
 "Fun" - 6:40
 "In the Good Old Summertime" (George Evans, Ren Shields) - 9:49
 "Lavender Woman" (Joe Zawinul) - 8:16  
 "Painted Desert" (Zawinul) - 8:48  
 "Theme" (Adderley, Zawinul) - 4:49  
Recorded at Memory Lane, San Francisco, CA on October 31, 1966

Personnel 
 Nat Adderley – cornet
 Joe Henderson (tracks 2-6) - tenor saxophone
 Joe Zawinul  - piano
 Victor Gaskin - bass
 Roy McCurdy - drums

References 

1967 live albums
Atlantic Records live albums
Nat Adderley live albums